Weston is a town in Fairfield County, Connecticut, United States. The population was 10,354 at the 2020 census. The town is served by Route 57 and Route 53, both of which run through the town center.

In 2017, SafeWise ranked Weston the safest town in Connecticut and the 6th safest town in the country.

Weston is the closest Connecticut town to New York City without a train station. Aside from a handful of stores that form the town's center, Weston has little commercial development and residential development is limited by two-acre zoning. Most of Devil's Den Preserve, a  nature reserve, which gets 40,000 visits a year, is located in the town.

History

In the 17th century, Weston's first English settlers were mostly farmers living in the town of Fairfield, Connecticut, the boundaries of which extended to Weston until the late 18th century. The Norfield Parish was created in the area now occupied by the towns of Weston and Easton. In 1787, the area was formally incorporated as the Town of Weston. It is believed to be named after Weston-super-Mare, which was a small fishing village surrounded by countryside farmland, which many of the early British farming settlers originated from. In 1845, the Town of Easton was split off from Weston.

A meteor exploded above the town on December 14, 1807. Six pieces, totaling , were recovered and examined by scientists, who issued a report. This experience provided information that expanded the contemporary thinking about meteors for many.

Despite rocky soil, farmers in town grew apples, onions, and potatoes. Grist, cider, lumber, and fulling mills were built. The town had nine manufacturers by 1850, but two decades later only the Bradley Edge Tool Company still thrived. That factory burned down in 1911.

Unlike other nearby towns, Weston never had a railroad built through it, which stifled the development of non-agricultural businesses. Between the Civil War and the Great Depression, the town's population dropped from approximately 1,000 to a low of 670, by 1930. Artists, writers, and actors from New York became attracted to the community in the 1930s and began settling in it. Construction of the Merritt Parkway, which arrived to the south of Weston in 1938, resulted in further population growth.

Geography

The Saugatuck River begins to the north in Redding. It flows through the town and ends in Long Island Sound in neighboring Westport.

Weston is bordered by Westport to the south, Wilton to the west, Redding to the north, Easton to the east, and Fairfield to the southeast.

Principal communities
Georgetown (part)
Lyons Plains
Weston Center (Norfield Historic District)
Aspetuck

Other minor communities and geographic areas are Devil's Den, Norfield, Upper Parish, and Valley Forge.

Demographics

As of the 2010 census, there were 10,025 people, 3,289 households, and 2,811 families residing in the town. The racial makeup of the town was 95.75% White, 0.88% African American, 0.11% Native American, 1.94% Asian, 0.10% Pacific Islander, 0.25% from other races, and 0.98% from two or more races. Hispanic or Latino of any race were 2.05% of the population.

There were 3,289 households, out of which 49.8% had children under the age of 18 living with them, 78.4% were married couples living together, 5.0% had a female householder with no husband present, and 15.1% were non-families. 11.2% of all households were made up of individuals, and 4.9% had someone living alone who was 65 years of age or older. The average household size was 3.03 and the average family size was 3.28.

In the town, the population was spread out, with 31% under the age of 18, 4% from 18 to 24, 31% from 25 to 49, 23% from 50 to 64, and 11% who were 65 years of age or older. The median age was 42 years. For every 100 females, there were 96.5 males. For every 100 females age 18 and over, there were 92.9 males.

, the median income for a household in the town was $219,868. Males had a median income of $168,472 versus $103,345 for females. The per capita income for the town was $95,534. About 2.6% of the population were below the poverty line.

In 2019, The National Council for Home Safety and Security ranked Weston the 4th safest town in the state of Connecticut. The National Council for Home Safety and Security ranked the safest towns and cities in Connecticut based on the most recent FBI Uniform Crime Report statistics and population sizes.

Government

Like many other New England towns, the government of Weston consists of the Town Meeting, and elective and appointive boards. First among the elective boards is the Board of Selectmen. Samantha Nestor is the First Selectwoman. By charter, the First Selectman is the Chief Executive and Administrative Officer of the town. The town's legislative powers are divided between the Board of Selectmen and the Town Meeting. Among other elective boards are the Board of Education, the Board of Finance, the Planning and Zoning Commission, and the Board of Police Commissioners.

On August 19, 2021, Martin Mohabeer became the first African-American to become a member of the Board of Selectmen when the Board voted to appoint him to fill a vacant seat.  His subsequent election to a new two year term in November of 2021 marked the first time an African-American was elected in Weston.

In the 2008 presidential election, Weston residents voted for Democrat Barack Obama with 62.21%. Republican John McCain received 37.33%. In 2016, Democrat Hillary Clinton carried Weston over Republican Donald Trump.

Budget and taxes
For the fiscal year of 2022-2023, the Town of Weston’s net budget is about $74-million.  About 77% of the town’s budget is spent on the Weston Public Schools. Weston raises taxes on the basis of property value.  With real estate assessed at 70% of market value, the mill rate evolved as follows:

To make the mill rates comparable, the asterisked numbers are adjusted to account for the real estate revaluation of 2018-2019.  The revaluation decreased the grand list by 6.3%. The numbers for 2013-2014 and prior years are also adjusted for revaluations in 2014 and 2009, respectively.

Town Center 
Commercial development in Weston is limited to the Town Center area located at the intersection of Weston Road and Norfield Road. The Town Center contains a grocery store, community bank, liquor store, casual restaurant, dry cleaner, realtor, gas station, pharmacy and a post office.

On the National Register of Historic Places
 Bradley Edge Tool Company Historic District – Roughly, Lyons Plains Road, north and south of the junction with White Birch Road (added December 22, 1995)
 Kettle Creek Historic District – Roughly, Weston and Old Weston Roads, north of Broad Street (added December 22, 1995)
 Norfield Historic District – Roughly, at the junction of Weston and Norfield Rds. northeast to Hedgerow Common (added August 31, 1991)

Education 

There are four public schools in the Weston Public Schools district, all located on School Road:
Weston High School (WHS) – grades 9–12, with about 800 students. Some Weston High School (WHS) seniors go on to attend selective colleges and universities. Recently the high school underwent a significant building expansion, which included construction of a new science department and playing fields. The high school auditorium was also updated in 2008.
Weston Middle School (WMS) – grades 6–8, with about 600 students.
Weston Intermediate School (WIS) – grades 3–5, with about 600 students. The school opened in September 2005 as the town's newest school.
Hurlbutt Elementary School (HES) – pre-kindergarten-grade 2, with about 600 students

In June 2012, 24/7 Wall St. ranked Weston as the second wealthiest school district in the United States.

In 2013 and 2014, U.S. News & World Report ranked Weston High School as the third best high school in Connecticut and the 240th best high school in the United States.

Weston High School was awarded the gold medal for its high level of student performance. The methodology of ranking this honor is based on student performance on standardized tests as well as participation in Advanced Placement (AP) and International Baccalaureate (IB) programs. AP programs are offered across a variety of subject matters, with sixty percent of WHS students participating.

In August 2015, Newsweek ranked Weston High School number 47 for America's Top High Schools in the country, public and private.

In August 2015, Weston High School was ranked the best in the state and 47th best in the country according to a survey conducted by Newsweek magazine. Each year, the magazine ranks the top 500 high schools in the country based on which institutions do the best job of preparing students for college. According to the study, Weston High School has a 97.2% college enrollment rate, a 100% graduation rate, an AP/IB/Dual Enrollment Composite of 73, a weighted SAT/ACT score composite of 69.4, a student retention rate of 91.7% and a counselor-to-student ratio of 1:156. In addition, the average SAT score at Weston High School is 1784, the average ACT score is 26.6, and the average AP test score is 3.87. [

In April 2019, U.S. News & World Report ranked Weston High School second best high school in the state and 169th best high school in the country out of 17,245 high schools ranked. In addition, Weston High School was also ranked 65th in STEM High Schools with a town graduation rate of 100%. U.S. News gave Weston a scorecard of 99.02% out of a possible 100. The Best High Schools rankings identify the country's top-performing public high schools. The goal is to provide a clear, unbiased picture of how well public schools serve all of their students—from the highest to lowest achieving—in preparing them to demonstrate proficiency in basic skills as well as readiness for college-level work.

The Connecticut State Department of Education has ranked the Weston schools in District Reference Group A (formerly the Educational Reference Group A), the nine most affluent and low-need-for-extra-assistance districts among the 162 school districts in Connecticut.

Several pre-schools in town are run by various churches, including Emmanuel Nursery School and Norfield Nursery School.

Parks
The landscape of Weston is characterized by open spaces. Almost one quarter of the town is permanently devoted to open space use, including:
Devil's Den Preserve, with a wide variety of flora and fauna, and with a  trail system that connects with the extended  Saugatuck Valley Trails System;
Bisceglie Park, with baseball fields, a swimming hole, a two-mile (3 km) jogging trail and fitness stations, along the west branch of the Saugatuck River;
Morehouse Farm Park, with eight, partially overlapping ball fields;
Open land around the Saugatuck Reservoir, with trails and opportunities for fishing.

Politics

Notable people

 Lucie Arnaz (born 1951), actress, daughter of Lucille Ball and Desi Arnaz
 Jayne Atkinson (Gill) (born 1959), Emmy-winning actor (ensemble, "24"), writer, producer (Hidden Meadow)
 George Balanchine (1904–1983), choreographer and influential figure in ballet
 Paul Cadmus (1904–1999), painter
 Liz Cho (born 1970), television anchor
 Frank Converse (born 1938), actor
 John Curran (1953–2013), financial journalist
 Rodney Dangerfield (1921–2004), comedian
 Bette Davis (1908–1989), actress
 Kyle Dunnigan (born 1971), comedian and actor 
 José Feliciano (born 1945), singer and songwriter
 Daniel Gerroll actor, Chariots of Fire
 Michel Gill (born 1960), actor, Pres. Walker, House of Cards, Mr. Robot (Golden Globe/ensemble), writer, producer
 Seth Grahame-Smith (born 1976), author, screenwriter, film and television producer and director, grew up in town
 Patti Hansen (born 1956), model, actress and wife of Keith Richards
 John Marshall Harlan II (1899–1971), Associate Justice of the Supreme Court, summered in Weston, buried in Weston's Emmanuel churchyard
 Mariette Hartley (born 1940), actress, native of Weston
 Fred Hellerman (1927-2016), singer and songwriter, founding member of The Weavers. Hellerman died on September 1, 2016, at his home in Weston
 Evan Hunter (1926–2005), author who wrote under the pen name "Ed McBain"
 Erica Jong (born 1942), author
 Patricia Kalember actor, thirtysomething and Sisters
 Eartha Kitt (1927–2008), entertainer, moved to town in 2002
 Lawrence Langner (1890–1962), playwright, author, and producer. Lived on what is now called Langner Lane
 Eva Le Gallienne (1899–1991), actress
 Billy Mann (born 1968), songwriter, record producer 
 Stanley Matthews, former Wimbledon Boys' Champion and son of Sir Stanley Matthews
 Paul Michael Levesque (born 1969), "Triple H", wrestler, World Wrestling Entertainment
 Marilyn Monroe (1926-1962), actress, lived on Fanton Hill in 1955 after completing the Seven Year Itch
 Brent Musburger (born 1939), sportscaster
 James Naughton (born 1945), actor
 Sachi Parker (born 1956), actress, daughter of Shirley Maclaine, frequent visitor of Weston
 Jacob Pitts (born 1979), actor
 Christopher Plummer (1929–2021), actor
 Paul Rand (1914–1996), graphic designer
 Robert Redford (born 1936), actor, had a home in town
 Fritz Reiner (1888–1963), conductor of the New York Philharmonic, the Metropolitan Opera, and other notable orchestras. Lived on Davis Hill beginning in 1938
 Jamey Richard (born 1984), pro football player
 Keith Richards (born 1943), musician, member of The Rolling Stones
 Angelo and Ettore Rossetti, Guinness World Record holders in racket sports
 John Seigenthaler, Jr. (born 1955), former NBC News weekend anchor
 Donna Summer (1948-2012), singer, had a home in town on Crystal Lake
 James Thurber (1894–1961), writer
 Willard Thorp Harry Truman‘s Assistant Secretary of State, among other roles
 Mike Vranos (born 1961), hedge fund manager and philanthropist
 Christopher Walken actor, lives in city

Notes

References

External links

Town of Weston official website
The Weston Way: a site all about Weston
School district
The New York Times: "Weston, Conn.: Quiet and Wooded, With Top-Notch Schools," August 30, 2017

 
Towns in Fairfield County, Connecticut
Towns in the New York metropolitan area
Towns in Connecticut